Checheviznya is a rural locality in Kosteltsevsky Selsoviet Rural Settlement, Kurchatovsky District, Kursk Oblast, Russia. Population:

Geography 
The village is located 69 km from the Russia–Ukraine border, 37 km north-west of Kursk, 12 km north of the district center – the town Kurchatov, 9.5 km from the selsoviet center – Kosteltsevo.

 Climate
Checheviznya has a warm-summer humid continental climate (Dfb in the Köppen climate classification).

Transport 
Checheviznya is located 30 km from the federal route  Crimea Highway, 12 km from the road of regional importance  (Kursk – Lgov – Rylsk – border with Ukraine), 25.5 km from the road  (Lgov – Konyshyovka), 3 km from the road of intermunicipal significance  (Seym River – Mosolovo – Nizhneye Soskovo), on the road Kurchatov – Zhmakino – Checheviznya, 12 km from the nearest railway halt Kurchatow (railway line Lgov I — Kursk).

The rural locality is situated 44 km from Kursk Vostochny Airport, 139 km from Belgorod International Airport and 246 km from Voronezh Peter the Great Airport.

References

Notes

Sources

Rural localities in Kurchatovsky District, Kursk Oblast